Pasquale Lattanzi (born March 24, 1950 in Civitavecchia) is a retired Italian professional football player.

References

1950 births
Living people
Italian footballers
Serie A players
People from Civitavecchia
Inter Milan players
Udinese Calcio players

Association football goalkeepers
Footballers from Lazio
Sportspeople from the Metropolitan City of Rome Capital